Rinderrouladen (plural, singular Rinderroulade) are a German meat dish, usually consisting of bacon, onions, mustard and pickles wrapped in thinly sliced beef which is then cooked. The dish is considered traditional also in the Upper Silesia region of Poland where it is known as rolada śląska (Silesian roulade) and in the Czech Republic where it is known as španělský ptáček (spanish bird). In Britain, the equivalent dish is widely referred to as beef olive.

Beef or veal is typically used, though some food scholars tend to believe that the original version was probably venison or pork, and pork is still popular in some areas. The beef rouladen as we know them today have become popular over the last century. The cut is usually topside beef or silverside since this is the cheaper cut. The meat is cut into large, thin slices.

The filling is a mixture of smoked and cooked pork belly, chopped onions and chopped pickles (gherkins) which is at times varied by adding minced meat or sausage meat. The mixture varies from region to region. Rouladen are traditionally served for dinner. Red wine is often used for the gravy.

Serving
Rinderrouladen are usually served with either potato dumplings or mashed potatoes and pickled red cabbage. Roasted winter vegetables are another common side dish. The gravy is an absolute requirement to round off the dish and is usually poured over the meat. Spätzle are a good complement to the dish since they soak up the gravy well.

Originally considered as a dish for common people, it is today enjoyed by many as a festive dish.

See also 
Roulade – filled rolled meat or pastry in general
Braciole
Zrazy
List of beef dishes
List of stuffed dishes

References

Austrian cuisine
Czech cuisine
German meat dishes
Polish cuisine
Silesian cuisine
Beef dishes
Stuffed dishes
Bacon dishes
Foods with alcoholic drinks